Luciano Sabrosa (born 25 July 1979) is a Brazilian retired footballer who last played for FC Goa as a defender in Indian Super League.

External links
 Luciano Sabrosa page at goal.com

Brazilian footballers
1979 births
Living people
Sportspeople from Rio Grande do Sul
Vasco SC players
Salgaocar FC players
Sporting Clube de Goa players
Mohammedan SC (Kolkata) players
Pune FC players
Expatriate footballers in India
Brazilian expatriate sportspeople in India
I-League players
Association football central defenders

Association football forwards